Dilemma Glacier is a steep, broken glacier descending from the Worcester Range into the western side of Skelton Glacier to the north of Ant Hill, in New Zealand. It was mapped and named in 1957 by the New Zealand party of the Commonwealth Trans-Antarctic Expedition, 1956–58, and so named because of difficulties encountered by the geological party in an attempted descent of this glacier.

References 

Glaciers of Hillary Coast